is a railway station on the Rikuu East Line in the city of Ōsaki, Miyagi Prefecture, Japan, operated by East Japan Railway Company (JR East).

Lines
Kaminome Station is served by the Rikuu East Line, and is located 28.6 rail kilometers from the terminus of the line at Kogota Station.

Station layout
Kaminome Station has one side platform, serving a single bi-directional track. The station is unattended.

History
The station was absorbed into the JR East network upon the privatization of JNR on April 1, 1987. The station was renamed to its present name on 22 March 1997.

Surrounding area
Japan National Route 47

See also
 List of Railway Stations in Japan

External links

  

Railway stations in Miyagi Prefecture
Rikuu East Line
Railway stations in Japan opened in 1964
Ōsaki, Miyagi
Stations of East Japan Railway Company